The following is a list of episodes from the Australian police-drama, Blue Heelers, which premiered on 10 September 1993 and concluded on 4 June 2006, due to its cancellation by the Seven Network. Blue Heelers, which was created by Hal McElroy and Tony Morphett and produced by Southern Star, ran for thirteen season and a total of 510 episodes of the hit programme were produced. Blue Heelers won a total of 25 Logie Awards, five of which were the Gold Logie, 3 AFI Awards, 3 People's Choice Awards, and 1 AWGIE Awards.

Series overview

Season 1 (1993/1994)

Season 2 (1995)

Season 3 (1996)

Season 4 (1997)

Season 5 (1998)

Season 6 (1999)

Season 7 (2000)

Season 8 (2001)

Season 9 (2002)

Season 10 (2003)

Season 11 (2004)

Season 12 (2005)

Season 13 (2006)

Blue Heelers Specials

Blue Heelers: Wheel of Fortune

References 

General
 Zuk, T. Blue Heelers: Episode guide, Australian Television Information Archive. Retrieved 14 August 2007.
 TV.com editors. Blue Heelers Episode Guide, TV.com. Retrieved 14 August 2007.
Specific

Blue Heelers
Blue Heelers